Death in the City is an apologetic work by American theologian Francis A. Schaeffer, Chicago: InterVarsity Press, first published in 1969. It is Book Four in Volume Four of The Complete Works of Francis A. Schaeffer: A Christian Worldview. Westchester, IL: Crossway Books, 1982.

Overview
This work was written by Schaeffer as an answer to the question:
In what has been called a post-Christian world, what should be our perspective and how should we function as individuals, as institutions, as orthodox Christians, and as those who claim to be Bible-believing? (p. 209)

The basic answer, given by Schaeffer in Chapter One, is that "the church in our generation needs reformation, revival, and constructive revolution." (p. 209)

Table of contents

 Chapter 1: Death in the City
 Chapter 2: The Loneliness of Man
 Chapter 3: The Message of Judgement
 Chapter 4: An Echo of the World
 Chapter 5: The Persistence of Compassion
 Chapter 6: The Significance of Man
 Chapter 7: The Man Without the Bible
 Chapter 8: The Justice of God
 Chapter 9: The Universe and Two Chairs

Notes

1969 non-fiction books
Christian apologetic works